Chínipas may mean:
Chínipas de Almada, a town in the south-west of the Mexican state of Chihuahua
Chínipas (municipality), the surrounding municipality
Chinipa (people), the indigenous people of this region
Chinipas River